Party for Democracy and Progress  may refer to:

 Party for Democracy and Social Progress, a political party in Benin.
 Party for Democracy and Progress (Burkina Faso)
 Party for Democracy and Progress / Socialist Party, a political party in Burkina-Faso.
 Party for Democracy and Progress (Mali)
 Party for Democracy and Progress (Tanzania)

See also 
 Party for Democracy (disambiguation)